Regina Douglas Park is a provincial electoral district for the Legislative Assembly of Saskatchewan, Canada. Created for the 18th Saskatchewan general election as "Regina Victoria", it was redrawn and renamed "Regina Douglas Park" by the Representation Act, 2002 (Saskatchewan).

The riding contains the neighbourhoods of Arnheim Place, Gladmer Park, Al Ritchie, Assiniboia East and Boot Hill.

Members of the Legislative Assembly

Election results

2009 by-election

|-

|- bgcolor="white"
!align="left" colspan=3|Total
!align="right"|6,199
!align="right"|100.00
!align="right"|

Regina Victoria (1975 – 2003)

References

External links 
Website of the Legislative Assembly of Saskatchewan
Saskatchewan Archives Board – Saskatchewan Election Results By Electoral Division
Map of Regina Douglas Park riding as of 2016

Politics of Regina, Saskatchewan
Saskatchewan provincial electoral districts